The 2000 ICC Under-19 World Cup was an international limited-overs cricket tournament played in Sri Lanka from 11 to 28 January 2000. It was the third edition of the Under-19 Cricket World Cup and the first to be held in Sri Lanka.

The 2000 World Cup was contested by sixteen teams, including three making their tournament debuts. After an initial group stage, the top eight teams played off in a super league to decide the tournament champions, with the non-qualifiers playing a separate "plate" competition. Portions of the group stage were heavily impacted by rain, especially in Group C, where only two matches could be played to completion. In the final, played at Colombo's Sinhalese Sports Club, India defeated Sri Lanka by six wickets. Both teams had made the final for the first time. Indian all-rounder Yuvraj Singh was named player of the tournament, while South Africa's Graeme Smith was the leading run-scorer and Pakistan's Zahid Saeed was the leading wicket-taker.

Teams and qualification

The nine full members of the International Cricket Council (ICC) qualified automatically for the World Cup, while another seven teams qualified via other paths. Bangladesh and Nepal qualified as the top two teams at the 1999 Youth Asia Cup, while Ireland and the Netherlands did likewise through the 1999 European Under-19 Championship. The ICC Africa Under-19 Championships were not established until 2001, but Kenya and Namibia were invited to the World Cup as the top ICC associate members in Africa. There was also no qualification tournament held in the Americas development region, with instead a combined regional team being fielded (for the first and only time).

  Americas

Group stage

Group A

Group B

Group C

Group D

Plate competition
The plate competition was contested by the eight teams that failed to qualify for the Super League.

Group 1

Group 2

Plate Semi-finals

Plate Final

Super League

Group 1

Group 2

Semi-finals

Final

References

2000 in cricket
ICC Under-19 Cricket World Cup
2000 in Sri Lankan cricket
International cricket competitions in Sri Lanka
2000 ICC Under-19 Cricket World Cup